Gholaman-e Olya (also Romanized as Gholāmān-e ‘Olyā; also known as Gholāmān) is a village in Shurab Rural District, Veysian District, Dowreh County, Lorestan Province, Iran. At the 2006 census, its population was 122, in 27 families.

References 

Towns and villages in Dowreh County